The 2019 European Juniors Wrestling Championships was held in Pontevedra, Spain between June 3–09, 2019.

Medal table

Team ranking

Medal summary

Men's freestyle

Men's Greco-Roman

Women's freestyle

References 

Wrestling
European Wrestling Juniors Championships
European Juniors Wrestling Championships
International wrestling competitions hosted by Spain